Tahir Rasheed is a Pakistani cricketer who hold the record for a wicket-keeper to dismiss most number of batsmen (9 dismissals, 8 caught and 1 stumped) in an innings in first-class cricket, for Habib Bank against Pakistan Automobiles Corporation at Gujranwala in 1992–93.

References

Pakistani cricketers
Living people
Cricketers from Karachi
Habib Bank Limited cricketers
Karachi cricketers
Karachi Whites cricketers
Karachi Blues cricketers
House Building Finance Corporation cricketers
Industrial Development Bank of Pakistan cricketers
1960 births